New Katni Junction railway station (station code:- NKJ) railway station, located on the Katni–Bilaspur line, serves Katni in Madhya Pradesh. Administrative head of New Katni Junction is Area Railway Manager. It is basically a marshaling yard and there are two locomotive sheds, Katni Diesel Shed and New Katni Electric Shed. There are also a box depot which is used for repair work of freight wagons. It is located between two rivers Simraul and Bimraul expanded in about 5 km.

A small colonial goods yard exist at KMZ during the early 1950s. To keep pace with industrial development of the country, setting up of Bhiali & Rourkela Steel Plants and the discovery of huge stock of coal in central coalfields it was becoming necessary that infra structural facilities of quicker transportation should be developed. With this view, in mind, the Railway Board in 1956 decided to go in for construction of a Marshalling Yard in New Katni Junction at an estimated cost of Rs. 90 Lac. A huge Marshalling Yard complex was constructed between river Simraul & Bimraul and the same was opened for traffic in the morning of 19 January 1961.

Loco sheds
Both the Katni Diesel Loco Shed and the Electric Loco Shed are located at New Katni Junction. The former has WDM-2, WDM-3A, WDM-3D WDG-3A, WDG-4, WDG-4D, WDS-6 and the only WDG-3C "Cheetah" diesel locomotives.  The latter holds 170+ WAG-5,  WAG-7 and WAG-9 electric locomotives and has a large marshalling yard attached to it. The shed has 240 diesel locomotives with 40 AC locomotives and 40 Alco locomotives.

New township
A new township for accommodating more than 5,000 railway employees has been developed at New Katni.

References

External links
 Trains at New Katni Junction Station

Katni district
Railway junction stations in Madhya Pradesh
Railway stations in Katni district
Jabalpur railway division